The Best of Vanilla Ice is a greatest hits album by American rapper Vanilla Ice. Released in 1999 by Platinum Disc Records, it features songs from the rapper's major label albums To the Extreme, Extremely Live, Cool as Ice (soundtrack) and Mind Blowin. No tracks from the 1998 album Hard to Swallow are included. The Best of Vanilla Ice was reissued by EMI, and later Collectables Records.

Track listing 
 "Ice Ice Baby" - 4:31
 "Get Wit' It"- 5:09
 "Play That Funky Music" (live)- 4:45
 "Roll 'Em Up"- 4:29
 "Rollin' in My 5.0" (live)- 4:17
 "Cool as Ice (Everybody Get Loose)"- 5:31
 "Hooked"- 4:52
 "I Love You"- 5:05
 "Ninja Rap"- 3:46
 "Satisfaction"- 3:43

References 

1999 greatest hits albums
Vanilla Ice compilation albums
EMI Records compilation albums